Sankt Georgen am Ybbsfelde is a town in the district of Amstetten in Lower Austria in Austria.

Geography
St. Georgen am Ybbsfelde lies in the Mostviertel in Lower Austria. About 14 percent of the municipality is forested.

References

Cities and towns in Amstetten District